The 2018 Radio Disney Music Awards were held on June 22, 2018, at the Dolby Theatre in Los Angeles, California. The ceremony was shown on Radio Disney and Disney Channel the following night on June 23, 2018, from 8:30 p.m. to 01:30 a.m. (EDT) and on Disney International HD and VTV3 on July 29, 2018 from 8p.m. to 9p.m. (IST). It was cancelled on Disney Channel in Southeast Asia and VTV6 in Vietnam due to unknown reasons.

Performances

Winners and nominees
Nominees were announced via a nomination live stream on April 27, 2018. Voting also began on the same day.

References

External links

Radio Disney Music Awards
Radio Disney
Radio Disney
Radio Disney
Radio Disney
Radio Disney Music Awards